James Briscoe (25 January 1914 – 10 June 1944) was an English professional footballer who played as a full back in the Football League for Southport.

Personal life
Briscoe served as a guardsman in the Coldstream Guards during the Second World War and was killed in Italy while serving with the 2nd Battalion, Coldstream Guards, part of the 6th Armoured Division, on 10 June 1944. He is buried at Bolsena War Cemetery.

Career statistics

References

1914 births
1944 deaths
Burials in Lazio
Military personnel from Lancashire
People from Skelmersdale
Footballers from Lancashire
Association football fullbacks
English footballers
English Football League players
Skelmersdale United F.C. players
Southport F.C. players
British Army personnel killed in World War II
Coldstream Guards soldiers